Tige Andrews (born Tiger Androwas; March 19, 1920 – January 27, 2007) was an American character actor. He is best remembered for his law-enforcement roles as Captain Adam Greer and Lieutenant Johnny Russo in two ABC crime drama television series: The Mod Squad, and The Detectives Starring Robert Taylor, respectively.

Early life
Andrews was born Tiger Androwas in Brooklyn, New York, one of ten children of Syrian parents Selma (née Shaleesh) and George E. Andrews. His family's surname was originally "Androwas". His parents, following Syrian custom, named him after a strong animal to ensure good health. His mother died when he was three years old, and his father later remarried. Andrews moved with his family to Middlesex, New Jersey, where Andrews graduated from Bound Brook High School. His father was in the fruit business, and Andrews worked for his father.

Andrews attended classes for a time at the University of Beirut medical school. During World War II, Andrews served with the United States Army's 45th Infantry Division, rising to the rank of second lieutenant. He was medically discharged in 1944 for injuries sustained when his ship sunk in the Mediterranean. He graduated from the American Academy of Dramatic Arts in New York in 1946.

Career 
After graduating from the Academy, Andrews made his Broadway debut in the play Hidden Horizons, in which he used his Syrian background to speak Arabic. He then appeared in the original 1948 cast of Thomas Heggen and Joshua Logan's war comedy Mister Roberts, in which he played the roles of Schlemmer and Insigna. He changed his stage name from "Tiger" to "Tige" in 1954.

Director John Ford saw the play while visiting New York and, remembering his performance in it years later, cast him in the 1955 film version of Mister Roberts. Andrews and Henry Fonda were the only members of the Broadway cast to appear in the film.

Back in New York in 1955, Andrews won critical acclaim as The Streetsinger in the long-running revival of Marc Blitzstein's translation of the Brecht-Weill musical, The Threepenny Opera, off-Broadway. It featured German star Lotte Lenya and an ensemble cast of future stars, including Beatrice Arthur, Jo Sullivan, John Astin, Jerry Orbach, Ed Asner, and Jerry Stiller. He reprised the role in San Francisco and Los Angeles, California, and went on to direct The Threepenny Opera in Arizona.

Andrews made frequent appearances on television in the 1960s. In addition to being a cast member of The Phil Silvers Show (1955–1957, as Tiger Andrews), Andrews appeared in such series as U.S. Marshal; The Lawless Years; Mr. Novak; Dundee and the Culhane; The Big Valley; The Fugitive; Gunsmoke; Gomer Pyle, U.S.M.C.; and Star Trek as Kras in the episode "Friday's Child", in which he was the first Klingon ever to die in that series.

His best known roles were Lieutenant Johnny Russo on The Detectives and as Captain Adam Greer on The Mod Squad. For the latter role, he received both an Emmy and a Golden Globe award nomination and won a Logie Award. Andrews reunited with his fellow Mod Squad cast members for a 1979 made-for-television film, The Return Of Mod Squad; it was their last appearance together. After The Mod Squad ended, Andrews continued to make guest appearances on various television series, such as Kojak; Marcus Welby, M.D.; Police Story; CHiPs; and Murder, She Wrote.

His film career included roles in Onionhead (1958), A Private's Affair (1959), In Enemy Country (1968), The Last Tycoon (1976), and Raid on Entebbe (1977, as Shimon Peres). He retired from acting in the early 1990s after having appeared in more than one hundred acting roles onstage, on film and on television.

In addition to his acting career, Andrews was an accomplished painter and singer. His artwork has been shown in Los Angeles art galleries, and some of it was published in the book Actors As Artists by Jim McMullan and Dick Gautier. He collaborated with Sandy Matlowsky and Sid Kuller on two original songs on his Tiger Records label in Los Angeles, California. "The Modfather" and "Keep America Beautiful" were the A and B sides of the vinyl 45 single release.

Personal life
In 1950 he married Norma Thornton, a ballerina who was a regular on The Ed Sullivan Show and appeared in the Broadway play Gentlemen Prefer Blondes. They had six children, three boys and three girls: Barbara, Gina, Julie, John, Steve and Tony, and eleven grandchildren. He was previously married to Josephine Phillips, whom he wed in 1944 after his medical discharge from the Army. Norma Thornton Andrews died in 1996.

Death
Andrews died of cardiac arrest at his home in Encino, California, on January 27, 2007, aged 86.

Filmography

Film

Television

References

External links

 
 
 
 
 
 Obituary in the Los Angeles Daily News
 

1920 births
2007 deaths
American male film actors
American male stage actors
American male television actors
Bound Brook High School alumni
United States Army personnel of World War II
Burials at Westwood Village Memorial Park Cemetery
People from Brooklyn
People from Greater Los Angeles
People from Middlesex, New Jersey
American people of Syrian descent
Male actors from New Jersey
Male actors from New York City
Male actors from Los Angeles
American Academy of Dramatic Arts alumni
United States Army soldiers
Middle Eastern Christians
20th-century American male actors